Christ Church, or Christ Episcopal Church, West River, is an historic Carpenter Gothic style Episcopal church at Owensville, Anne Arundel County, Maryland, United States. It is a small, board-and-batten church with a long narrow nave, small deep chancel, and an entrance porch on its south side. The church is reputed to be by the noted church architect, Richard Upjohn and was at least built from his published designs of 1852.

Christ Church was listed on the National Register of Historic Places in 1973.

References

External links
, including photo from 1990, at Maryland Historical Trust
Christ Episcopal Church, West River website

1869 establishments in Maryland
Churches on the National Register of Historic Places in Maryland
Episcopal church buildings in Maryland
Churches in Anne Arundel County, Maryland
Churches completed in 1869
19th-century Episcopal church buildings
Carpenter Gothic church buildings in Maryland
National Register of Historic Places in Anne Arundel County, Maryland